Each team's roster for the 2013 IIHF Women's World Championship consists of at least 15 skaters (forwards, and defencemen) and 2 goaltenders, and at most 20 skaters and 3 goaltenders. All eight participating nations, through the confirmation of their respective national associations, had to submit a roster by the first IIHF directorate meeting.

The 23-player roster was announced on 18 March 2013.

Head coach: Dan Church

Skaters

Goaltenders

The 22-player roster was announced on 18 March 2013.

Head coach: Karel Manhart

Skaters

Goaltenders

The 23-player roster was announced on 18 March 2013.

Head coach: Mika Pieniniemi

Skaters

Goaltenders

The 21-player roster was announced on 18 March 2013.

Head coach: Peter Kathan

Skaters

Goaltenders

Head coach: Mikhail Chekanov

Skaters

Goaltenders

The 23-player roster was announced on 18 March 2013.

Head coach: Niclas Högberg

Skaters

Goaltenders

Head coach: René Kammerer

Skaters

Goaltenders

A 28-player roster was announced on 21 March 2013.

Head coach: Katey Stone

Skaters

Goaltenders

References

Team rosters

Canada
Czech Republic
Finland
Germany

Russia
Sweden
Switzerland
United States

Team statistics

Canada
Czech Republic
Finland
Germany

Russia
Sweden
Switzerland
United States

External links
IIHF Site

rosters
IIHF Women's World Championship rosters